Evans blue may refer to:

 Evans blue (dye)
 Evans Blue, Canadian rock band